Kleiber's law, named after Max Kleiber for his biology work in the early 1930s, is the observation that, for the vast majority of animals, an animal's metabolic rate scales to the  power of the animal's mass. Thus, over the same time span, a cat having a mass 100 times that of a mouse will consume only about 32 times the energy the mouse uses. 

The exact value of the exponent in Kleiber's law is unclear, in part because the law currently lacks a single theoretical explanation that is entirely satisfactory.

Proposed explanations for the law 
Kleiber's law, as many other biological allometric laws, is a consequence of the physics and/or geometry of animal circulatory systems. Max Kleiber first discovered the law when analyzing a large number of independent studies on respiration within individual species.

Heuristic explanation 
One explanation for Kleiber's law lies in the difference between structural and growth mass.  Structural mass involves maintenance costs, reserve mass does not.  Hence, small adults of one species respire more per unit of weight than large adults of another species because a larger fraction of their body mass consists of structure rather than reserve. Within each species, young (i.e., small) organisms respire more per unit of weight than old (large) ones of the same species because of the overhead costs of growth.

Exponent  
Explanations for -scaling tend to assume that metabolic rates scale to avoid heat exhaustion. Because bodies lose heat passively via their surface, but produce heat metabolically throughout their mass, the metabolic rate must scale in such a way as to counteract the square–cube law.

Such an argument does not address the fact that different organisms exhibit different shapes (and hence have different surface-area-to-volume ratios, even when scaled to the same size).  Reasonable estimates for organisms' surface area do appear to scale linearly with the metabolic rate.

Exponent  
A model due to West, Enquist, and Brown (hereafter WEB) suggests that -scaling arises because of efficiency in nutrient distribution and transport throughout an organism.  In most organisms, metabolism is supported by a circulatory system featuring branching tubules (i.e., plant vascular systems, insect tracheae, or the human cardiovascular system).  WEB claim that (1) metabolism should scale proportionally to nutrient flow (or, equivalently, total fluid flow) in this circulatory system and (2) in order to minimize the energy dissipated in transport, the volume of fluid used to transport nutrients (i.e., blood volume) is a fixed fraction of body mass.  

They then proceed by analyzing the consequences of these two claims at the level of the smallest circulatory tubules (capillaries, alveoli, etc.).  Experimentally, the volume contained in those smallest tubules is constant across a wide range of masses.  Because fluid flow through a tubule is determined by the volume thereof, the total fluid flow is proportional to the total number of smallest tubules.  Thus, if  denotes the basal metabolic rate,  the total fluid flow, and  the number of minimal tubules,  Circulatory systems do not grow by simply scaling proportionally larger; they become more deeply nested.  The depth of nesting depends on the self-similarity exponents of the tubule dimensions, and the effects of that depth depend on how many "child" tubules each branching produces.  Connecting these values to macroscopic quantities depends (very loosely) on a precise model of tubules.  WEB show that, if the tubules are well-approximated by rigid cylinders, then, in order to prevent the fluid from "getting clogged" in small cylinders, the total fluid volume  satisfies  (Despite conceptual similarities, this condition is inconsistent with Murray's law.)  Because blood volume is a fixed fraction of body mass,

Non-power-law scaling 
Closer analysis suggests that Kleiber's law does not hold over a wide variety of scales. As a result, log-log plots of metabolic rate versus body mass appear to "curve" upward, and fit better to quadratic models. In all cases, local fits exhibit exponents in the  range.

Modified circulatory models 
Adjustments to the WBE model that retain assumptions of network shape predict larger scaling exponents, worsening the discrepancy with observed data. But one can retain a similar theory by relaxing WBE's assumption of a nutrient transport network that is both fractal and circulatory. (WBE argued that fractal circulatory networks would necessarily evolve to minimize energy used for transport, but other researchers argue that their derivation contains subtle errors.)

Modified thermodynamic models 
An alternative model notes that metabolic rate does not solely serve to generate heat. Metabolic rate contributing solely to useful work should scale with power 1 (linearly), whereas metabolic rate contributing to heat generation should be limited by surface area and scale with power .

Criticism of explanations 
Kozłowski and Konarzewski have argued that attempts to explain Kleiber's law via any sort of limiting factor is flawed, because metabolic rates vary by factors of 4-5 between rest and activity.  Hence any limits that affect the scaling of basal metabolic rate would in fact make elevated metabolism — and hence all animal activity — impossible.  WEB conversely argue that animals may well optimize for minimal transport energy dissipation during rest, without abandoning the ability for less efficient function at other times.

Other researchers have also noted that Kozłowski and Konarzewski's criticism of the law tends to focus on precise structural details of the WEB circulatory networks, but that the latter are not essential to the model.

Experimental support 
Analyses of variance for a variety of physical variables suggest that although most variation in basal metabolic rate is determined by mass, additional variables with significant effects include body temperature and taxonomic order.

A 1932 work by Brody calculated that the scaling was approximately 0.73.

A 2004 analysis of field metabolic rates for mammals conclude that they appear to scale with exponent 0.749.

Generalizations 
Kleiber's law only applies to interspecific comparisons; it (usually) does not apply to intraspecific ones.  Indeed, Kleiber's law only appears when studying animals as a whole; scaling exponents within taxonomic subgroupings differ substantially.

In other kingdoms 
A 1999 analysis concluded that biomass production in a given plant scaled with the  power of the plant's mass during the plant's growth, but a 2001 paper that included various types of unicellular photosynthetic organisms found scaling exponents intermediate between 0.75 and 1.00.  

A 2006 paper in Nature argued that the exponent of mass is close to 1 for plant seedlings, but that variation between species, phyla, and growth conditions overwhelm any "Kleiber's law"-like effects.

Intra-organismal results 
Because cell protoplasm appears to have constant density across a range of organism masses, a consequence of Kleiber's law is that, in larger species, less energy is available to each cell volume.  Cells appear to cope with this difficulty via choosing one of the following two strategies: smaller cells or a slower cellular metabolic rate.  Neurons and adipocytes exhibit the former; every other type of cell, the latter.  As a result, different organs exhibit different allometric scalings (see table).

{| class="wikitable sortable"
|+
Allometric scalings for BMR-vs.-mass in human tissue
!Organ !! Scaling Exponent
|-
|Brain || 0.7
|-
|Kidney || 0.85
|-
|Liver || 0.87
|-
|Heart || 0.98
|-
|Muscle || 1.0
|-
|Skeleton || 1.1
|}

See also 
 Allometric law
 Evolutionary physiology
 Metabolic theory of ecology
 Scaling law
Rate-of-living theory

References

Further reading 

 
 
 
 
 

 

Power laws
Ecological theories